Shāhzāda Bārbak, known by his regnal title as Ghiyāsuddīn Bārbak Shāh, was the Sultan of Bengal in 1487 and the founder of the Sultanate's Habshi dynasty. He was a former commander of the palace-guards of Jalaluddin Fateh Shah court.

Biography
During the reign of Jalaluddin Fateh Shah of the Bengali Muslim Ilyas Shahi dynasty, some Abyssinian eunuch slaves ended up in important and influential positions in the royal court, many as paiks (palace guards). Barbak was an eunuch and was one of the increasingly powerful of the Abyssinian palace guards, eventually being promoted to commander of the palace-guards. He led a rebellion against Sultan Fateh Shah and killed him.

Shahzada Barbak took power in 1487 and started what was to become a Habshi dynasty of rulers in Bengal. He assumed the title Sultan Shahzada. Few coins have been discovered bearing his name.

His reign was short-lived, being murdered roughly in the same year as his coronation by Saifuddin Firuz Shah, an Abyssinian eunuch who was loyal to the Ilyas Shahi dynasty and was commander of the army.

See also
 List of rulers of Bengal
 History of Bengal
 History of India

References

Sultans of Bengal
1487 deaths
Year of birth unknown
15th-century Indian monarchs
Habshis of Bengal